Lorang Christiansen (22 January 1917 – 2 February 1991) was a Norwegian cyclist. He competed at the 1948 and 1952 Summer Olympics. His best finish was a 28th place in the road race in 1952. He represented the club Sagene IF.

References

External links
 

1917 births
1991 deaths
Cyclists from Oslo
Norwegian male cyclists
Olympic cyclists of Norway
Cyclists at the 1948 Summer Olympics
Cyclists at the 1952 Summer Olympics